The history of the Jewish Community in Belmonte, Portugal dates back to the 12th century and consists of Spanish and Portuguese Jews who kept their faith alive through the practice of Crypto-Judaism. The Sephardic tradition of Crypto-Judaism is unique and represented a hub of resistance against European Anti-Semitism.

Belmonte Marranos

The Marranoes are also referred to as ‘Belmonte Jews’, or ‘Conversos’. They are the Jewish community in Belmonte that have survived in secrecy for hundreds of years. The community was forced under King Manuel I to convert to Catholicism in 1490. Otherwise, they would face exile. They kept their faith alive through a tradition of Crypto-Judaism and endogamy. Traditions were kept alive by unique candlelight ceremonies, Sabbath candles submerged in clay jars, and sausages constructed out of flour and chicken. They were hung on their windows to prevent arousing suspicion from local authorities. The secret community was discovered in 1917 by a Polish Jewish mining engineer named Samuel Schwartz.

Schwartz first arrived in Belmonte at the beginning of the breakout of World War I. He had just married his wife, Agatha Barbasch, in April 1914, in Odessa. As a result of the war, locating work in Western Europe was nearly impossible. They decided to move to Lisbon, Portugal in 1915. He began working at the tungsten and tin mines of Vilar Formoso and Belmonte, in the Trás-Os-Montes region. It was here that he discovered forgotten Jewish communities in Belmonte. More specifically, the ‘Crypto-Jews’ or 'Marranos' whose public identity was Christian, and worshiped in the hub of their homes. He found a Stele with Hebrew inscriptions. He recognised it belonged to the early synagogue to the Jewish community in Belmonte. A Christian merchant in the mining field warned him not to investigate further, as people in the community had a divide labeling people as either “Jews” or “Christians”, he claimed: “It is enough for me to tell you he is a Jew.” He soon after met Baltasar Pereira de Sousa, who introduced Schwartz to the Marrano families in Belmonte; who were under the belief he was Jewish. After eight years of research, investigating their livelihoods and intimate, secret religion, he published his book: “The New Christians in Portugal in the 20th Century,” in 1925. It was this novel that made the world aware of the existence of the Jewish community in Belmonte. Schwartz died in Lisbon in 1953. They officially gained acceptance in 1994 when an Israeli Rabbi went to Belmonte to convert a Belmonte group.

Crypto-Judaism
The Sephardic tradition of Crypto-Judaism is unique, and dates back to the Middle Ages. The word “crypto” originates from the Greek term kryptos (κρυπτός), which translates to “hidden”. It is defined as the Jewish tradition that was practiced in secrecy under the public guise of Christianity. Since the fall of Jerusalem in 70 AD, the Jewish community went through centuries of enslavement in the Middle East and Europe. The true distinction between Judaism and Christianity did not occur until 380 AD. When Christianity became the official religion of the Roman Empire, and dominated social and cultural life in Europe. The Jews during the early stages of ancient anti-semitism were charged with ‘Deicide’. The charge blamed Jews for the killing of Jesus Christ. This charge has lasted centuries. There are many different circumstances that dictated whether they could practice their faith. However, the fluctuating history of European anti-semitism, since the charge of ‘deicide’, did mean that they mostly had to hide their heritage.

The Portuguese Inquisition
The Medieval Inquisitions of the late 12th century triggered a chain of three Christian Inquisitions throughout Western Europe. These include the Spanish Inquisition of the late 15th century and the Roman and Portuguese Inquisitions of the 16th century. The first stage of the Inquisition began in Spain in 1478. By 1481, Conversos were targeted. Conversos were Jews who publicly renounced the Jewish faith and adopted Christianity due to the pressure of the Spanish Inquisition. Conversos were expelled from Spain in 1492 and as a result, thousands migrated to Portugal. The next stage of the Inquisition spread from Spain to Portugal in 1536 and ended in 1821. The Inquisition in Portugal was also referred to as the ‘General Council of the Holy Office of the Inquisition of Portugal.’ The targets were converts from Judaism to Catholicism. (Also referred to as Converso or Marranos, who were suspected and accused of practicing their faith in secret). The Inquisition triggered a diaspora group that formed in Portugal, who are referred to as “Crypto-Jews”. They kept their outside image as Christian to survive but practiced Judaism in secret. The Inquisition spread to censor any Jewish-related material. As art was considered a tool that was used to differentiate Christianity from the ‘new Jews’. In other words, to differentiate from the converts. Art and literature was put under censorship to protect from infiltration. Under the reign of John III of Portugal, he instilled the censure of books, and extended to court cases of divination, witchcraft and bigamy. These are all tropes of antisemitism that categorised the Jew as inhuman and a killer of Christ. 

As a result of the Inquisition, many Crypto-Jews migrated to Goa. This extended to a Goa Inquisition (1560-1821). Regardless of the fact that Jews converted to Catholicism, they were still suspected of heresy. It is Karl Eugen Dühring who deemed: “A Jewish question would still exist, even if every Jew were to turn his back on his religion and join every one of our major Churches.”  The fear manifested into political debate as converted Jews were seen as unassimilable to Christianity due to their unchangeable race and Jewish blood. Throughout the Inquisition period, tribunals were established in Lisbon and other cities. Approximately, 40,000 tribunal cases were recorded, 1,800 were burned at the stake, and the remaining made penance. The auto-de-fe (the phrase converts to ‘act of faith’ and is a public penance of the accused heretics once they had decided their punishment after the trial) was held over several hours with great crowds attending. As opposed to torture, testimonies and trials being held in secrecy.  The last of the auto-de-fe cases in Portugal occurred on the 27th of October, 1765. As a result of the Portuguese Inquisition, the victim estimate sits at 40,000. Many of whom were originally Spanish Jews who migrated to Portugal, either from anti-Judaic expulsion, or refusal to convert to Christianity. Notable Jews who died in this Inquisition period in Portugal include: Isaac de Castro Tartas, Antonio Serrao de Castro and Antonio Jose da Silva. The Portuguese Inquisition was officially suspended for a period of five years (1676-1681) due to the work of Antolio Vieria in Rome, who sympathized with the victims of the Holy Office. Pope Innocent XI requested Vieria publish a two-hundred word report on the Portuguese Inquisition for him to adjudicate. He made it possible that the distinction between Jews and new/old Christians was abolished. It was officially abolished in 1821 by the "General Extraordinary and Constituent Assembly of the Portuguese Nation." The Inquisition came to an end in the latter period of the 18th century, due to Enlightenment ideas permeating throughout Europe.

Belmonte
There is little evidence of the Jews in the town of Belmonte. Antonieta Garcia is the wife of the Ex-Mayor of Belmonte, who grew up as a Marrano in the late 20th century. She writes on the expulsion period and the forced conversion of the Portuguese Jews during the Inquisition:

‘It is estimated that at most five thousand people left the country, out of 75,000 Jews who originally lived in Portugal, and possibly 120,000 exiles more from Spain... Some of these became New-Christians, Marranos... terms that are still current today in Belmonte. The term Marrano has a pejorative connotation, since it refers both to a pig and to the Jewish-connotation. The source of the obscurity and overlap is very old, as we are taught by Padre Frei Francisco de Torregoncillo:[3] “in the past these terms were used especially to greet those who are worse than dogs, like Marranos... which means pigs in Spanish, and this is because of what characterizes both the Marranos and pigs, that if one of them snores or grunts, all the rest rush upon hearing the snoring.” 

The First Republic in Portugal was established in 1910-1926, and Garcia explains that with Schwartz’ arrival in 1917, it triggered an openness amongst the community. The Crypto-Jews no longer needed to hide their faith. Until the dictatorship of António de Oliveira Salazar from 1926 to 1974. It was easier to identify who a ‘Crypto-Jew’ was because they had come out of hiding. To avoid arousing suspicion, Garcia explains: 

“On the Jewish holidays, the men would go out into the street to avoid arousing suspicion. But it was up to us – the women who stayed inside the house – to take care of everything. We sang and we recited the prayers only after putting the young children to sleep. If they had heard us saying the prayers, they might have unintentionally repeated what they heard at home when out into the street. Only after they were mature... [for example when they began] to keep all the fasts, did we include them in our ceremony. Not only that: when we didn't come to church for mass, and other people bothered us because of that in school, we were trained to say that we had heard mass on the radio, or on television.” (44-46)

The Carnation Revolution on April 25th, 1974, marked the end of the anti-semitic period in Portugal’s fascist political landscape. Garcia notes that this marked a period where the behaviors of the Jews changed. They were given more political autonomy. In 1986, one of the members of the Belmonte community, João Diogo, was elected to the Municipal-Council. In November, 1987 there was a ceremony that welcomed Sabbath in the Municipal Auditorium. A total of sixty-three people attended, and was held by Rabbi Haim Shapira. Garcia claims this event marked ‘a renewal of the organization that was interrupted in 1930, and its purpose was to carry out the declared wish of the community of Belmonte: to return to the bosom of traditional Judaism.’ 

There was a slow ease out of secrecy, and the end of António de Oliveira Salazar’s dictatorship contributed to Portugal’s acceptance after the 1974 transition to democracy. The Kehilah (community) of the Jews of Belmonte was created. As all its members had not all converted, it was called ‘The Community’. To demonstrate the nation-wide acceptance, its legitimacy was published in the “Diario da Republica” on January 9, 1989. Finally, the following month on the 8th of February, the list of rights and responsibilities of the community members were published: 

 To spread the Jewish religion among the members;
 To spread the Jewish cultural tradition;
 To encourage and motivate unity and mutual assistance among the Jews of Belmonte and in general among the Jews of Portugal;
 To be involved, as an autonomous community, in the Jewish community of Lisbon, since it is the only body that represents the Jews of Portugal;
 To inform the Jews of the entire world about the return of the Crypto-Jews of Portugal to the bosom of Judaism;
 To act toward cooperation with Jewish individuals and organization to achieve the aforementioned goals ...

The history of Crypto-Judaism in Belmonte is an active interest in present day society. Garcia reports on the ‘International Conference in Trancoso on the History of the Beriras and the Jews of the Iberian-Peninsula’. The conference included: lectures, exhibitions, films, tours of the Jewish quarters and other historical sites of Belmonte. As a result of this conference, it is evident that the Sephardic tradition of Crypto-Judaism did represent a hub of Judaism and resistance against anti-semitism, because at the conference ‘it was also reported that they intended to make Belmonte in Portugal into the sister-city of Yavneh in Israel.’ Today, there is an active synagogue and museum dedicated to the history of this tradition, and dedications throughout the town paying solace to those who were murdered. There is a preserved Hebrew synagogal inscription of 1296-1297, that was planned to be placed above the synagogue ark. When the community finally gained acceptance and could freely practice their faith publicly in the 1970s, a synagogue, Bet Eliahu, was opened in 1996.

In 2003, the Belmonte Project was founded under the auspices of the American Sephardi Federation, in order to raise funds to acquire Judaic educational material and services for the community (which now numbers 300). A Jewish Museum of Belmonte (Museu Judaico de Belmonte) opened on 17 April 2005. In the summer of 2006, the American Sephardi Federation ceased to have the Belmonte Project under its auspices. Their Sephardic tradition of Crypto-Judaism is considered unique.

William Annyas (or Anes)—a descendant of a Marrano family from Belmonte who immigrated to Ireland and reverted to Judaism—became the Mayor of Youghal in County Cork in 1555, the first person of the Jewish religion to hold such an elected position in Ireland.

See also
Auto-da-fé
History of the Jews in Portugal
Portuguese Inquisition
Sephardi Jews
Spanish and Portuguese Jews

References

External links
jewishwebindex.com (Jews of Portugal, Spain, Gibraltar and Majorca)
Jews Bring Prosperity to Iberian Town

Belmonte
Belmonet
Belmonte
Belmonte
Crypto-Jews

pt:Belmonte (Portugal)#Comunidade judaica